Rivilganj is a town and one of the oldest nagar panchayat in Saran district in the Indian state of Bihar.

Nagar Panchayat
The Nagar Panchayat of Rivilganj is considered as one of the oldest Nagar Panchayat of Bihar.

History

Rivilganj was the birthplace of Mata Anjana, the mother of Hanuman, the bhakt (devotee) of Rama. This place is also known for Ahilya Uddhar (absolution). A temple devoted to Maharishi Gautam, also known as Gautam Sthan is located at Godna  locality. A temple devoted to Kali Mata, also known as Kaliasthan is located at  Baiju Tolla locality. There is also an ashram of Shringi Rishi in the municipality.

Geography
It has an average elevation of 52 metres (170 feet).

Demographics
 India census, Rivilganj had a population of 34,044. Males constitute 52% of the population and females 48%.

References

Cities and towns in Saran district